Cheek Mountain Thief is a project started in 2011 by Mike Lindsay, founding member of the UK twisted acid folk band Tunng. He lives in Iceland where he formed a band with musicians from Húsavík and Reykjavík.

Lindsay said that his love affair with Iceland began in 2006. It involved a girl, Harpa, and an unforgettable New Year's Eve party. In 2011, Lindsay returned to Iceland to rekindle that romance, and to record a new album under the name Cheek Mountain Thief, inspired by the landscape and the people of Iceland.

The band is signed on the London independent record label Full Time Hobby.

Discography 
Their first album under the name "The Cheek Mountain Thief" received good reviews as reported by sources.

Cheek Mountain Thief · 2012

References

External links 

Icelandic indie rock groups
Musical groups from Reykjavík
Full Time Hobby artists